The Aderyn y corph (a.k.a. Corpse bird) is a bird from Welsh folklore who portends death. The bird has no feathers or wings. When not calling outside of a person's door, it is said to live on another plane of existence.

The aderyn y corph is referenced twice in the Welsh-language version of the bible, which some authors have claimed is the origin of the superstition. Many contemporary accounts of the corpse bird have suggested that it is actually a screech owl, drawn to lights coming from the room of a patient.

References

Mythological birds of prey
Welsh legendary creatures